Hyde Park is a 1934 British comedy film directed by Randall Faye and starring George Carney, Barry Clifton and Eve Lister. It follows a socialist who refuses to give permission for his daughter to marry an aristocrat, but changes his mind when he himself comes into money.

Main cast
 George Carney – Joe Smith
 Barry Clifton – Bill Lenbridge
 Eve Lister – Mary Smith
 Wallace Lupino – Alf Turner
 Charles Carlson – Lord Lenbridge
 Phyllis Morris – Mrs Smith
 Charles Hawtrey

References

External links

1934 films
Films directed by Randall Faye
1934 comedy films
British comedy films
British black-and-white films
1930s English-language films
1930s British films